Joseph Röckel may refer to:
 Joseph August Röckel, German operatic tenor and opera producer
 Joseph Leopold Röckel, composer and music teacher